DCPO or Dcpo may refer to:

Dame Commander of the Pontifical Order of Pius IX, female variant of a class in one of the orders of knighthood of the Holy See
Directed complete partial order, in mathematics a special class of partially ordered sets, characterized by particular completeness properties